3-Phosphoglyceric acid (3PG, 3-PGA, or PGA) is the conjugate acid of 3-phosphoglycerate or glycerate 3-phosphate (GP or G3P). This glycerate is a biochemically significant metabolic intermediate in both glycolysis and the Calvin-Benson cycle. The anion is often termed as PGA when referring to the Calvin-Benson cycle.  In the Calvin-Benson cycle, 3-phosphoglycerate is typically the product of the spontaneous scission of an unstable 6-carbon intermediate formed upon CO2 fixation.  Thus, two equivalents of 3-phosphoglycerate are produced for each molecule of CO2 that is fixed. In glycolysis, 3-phosphoglycerate is an intermediate following the dephosphorylation (reduction) of 1,3-bisphosphoglycerate.

Glycolysis

In the glycolytic pathway, 1,3-bisphosphoglycerate is dephosphorylated to form 3-phosphoglyceric acid in a coupled reaction producing two ATP via substrate-level phosphorylation. The single phosphate group left on the 3-PGA molecule then moves from an end carbon to a central carbon, producing 2-phosphoglycerate. This phosphate group relocation is catalyzed by phosphoglycerate mutase, an enzyme that also catalyzes the reverse reaction.

Calvin-Benson cycle
In the light-independent reactions (also known as the Calvin-Benson cycle), two 3-phosphoglycerate molecules are synthesized. RuBP, a 5-carbon sugar, undergoes carbon fixation, catalyzed by the rubisco enzyme, to become an unstable 6-carbon intermediate. This intermediate is then cleaved into two, separate 3-carbon molecules of 3-PGA. One of the resultant 3-PGA molecules continues through the Calvin-Benson cycle to be regenerated into RuBP while the other is reduced to form one molecule of glyceraldehyde 3-phosphate (G3P) in two steps: the phosphorylation of 3-PGA into 1,3-bisphosphoglyceric acid via the enzyme phosphoglycerate kinase (the reverse of the reaction seen in glycolysis) and the subsequent catalysis by glyceraldehyde 3-phosphate dehydrogenase into G3P. G3P eventually reacts to form the sugars such as glucose or fructose or more complex starches.

Amino acid synthesis
Glycerate 3-phosphate (formed from 3-phosphoglycerate) is also a precursor for serine, which, in turn, can create cysteine and glycine through the homocysteine cycle.

Measurement
3-phosphoglycerate can be separated and measured using paper chromatography as well as with column chromatography and other chromatographic separation methods. It can be identified using both gas-chromatography and liquid-chromatography mass spectrometry and has been optimized for evaluation using tandem MS techniques.

See also
 2-Phosphoglyceric acid
 Calvin-Benson cycle
 Photosynthesis
 Ribulose 1,5-bisphosphate

References

Carboxylate anions
Organophosphates
Photosynthesis
Glycolysis